Daniel Eton Somes (May 20, 1815 – February 13, 1888) was a United States representative from Maine.

Early life
Daniel Eton Somes was born in Meredith, New Hampshire (now Laconia) on May 20, 1815. He received an academic education, then moved to Biddeford, Maine, in 1846. He established the Eastern Journal, later known as the Union and Journal.

Career
Somes engaged in the manufacture of loom harnesses, reed twine, and varnishes.

Somes was elected the first Mayor of Biddeford 1855–1857.  Somes was president of the City Bank of Biddeford 1856–1858, and elected as a Republican to the Thirty-sixth Congress (March 4, 1859 – March 3, 1861). He was a  member of the Peace Convention of 1861 held in Washington, D.C., in an effort to devise means to prevent the impending war.

Somes and his wife are mentioned in connection with the seances conducted and the home of Cranston Laurie, a leader of the Spiritualist movement in Washington during the war. According to others, he and his wife were present when both President and Mrs. Lincoln attended the seances.

Somes engaged in the practice of patent law in Washington, D.C. until his death in that city on February 13, 1888.  His interment was in Rock Creek Cemetery.

References

1815 births
1888 deaths
People from Laconia, New Hampshire
Mayors of Biddeford, Maine
Republican Party members of the United States House of Representatives from Maine
19th-century American politicians
People from Meredith, New Hampshire
Burials at Rock Creek Cemetery